The 2008 Speedway Ekstraliga season is the 9th since its establishment. The first fixtures of the season are scheduled for April 6, 2008, and the season will end on October 19, 2008. Unia Leszno are the defending Polish champions. The Speedway Ekstraliga (pl. Ekstraliga żużlowa) is the top division of speedway in the Poland.

The 2008 Juniors League (pl. Liga Juniorów) season is the first its establishment. Every Ekstraliga team must send a Team U-21 to youth league. Eight events will be on July and August.

Teams 

Toruń - have never been relegated to a lower division.
Gorzów Wlkp. - 1st in First League.

Squad of Teams

First round

League table

Results 
The home team is listed in the left-hand column. Blue indicates a win to the home team while a red represents a loss to the home team.

Play-offs

Quarter-finals

Semi-finals

Finals

Final classification

Relegation playoffs

Juniors League 

Race format

References and notes

See also 
 Speedway in Poland

External links 
 Official side

2008
Ekstraliga